The Shameless Old Lady (Original title: La Vieille dame indigne) is a 1965 French film. Based on the 1939 short story :de:Die unwürdige Greisin by Bertolt Brecht, it was directed by René Allio and stars Sylvie and Victor Lanoux. Sylvie won the National Society of Film Critics Award for Best Actress for this role, one of her latter roles and her only lead.

Plot 
Madame Berthe, a newly widowed 70-year-old miser, has lived a sheltered life married to her husband for some 60 years. She determines to venture into the modern world and have as much fun as possible, and in doing so, finds that she loves it. She blows her life savings, much to the disapproval of the young people around her.

Cast 
Sylvie - Madame Berthe
Victor Lanoux - Pierre
Malka Ribowska - Rosalie
François Maistre - Gaston
Étienne Bierry - Albert
Pascale de Boysson - Simone
Jean-Louis Lamande - Charles
Lena Delanne - Victoire
Jeanne Hardeyn - Rose
Robert Bousquet - Robert
Jean Bouise - Alphonse
André Jourdan - Lucien
Pierre Decazes - Charlot
André Thorent - Dufour

External links 

Shameless
Films based on works by Bertolt Brecht
Shameless
1960s French films